The 2002 World Field Archery Championships were held in Canberra, Australia.

Medal summary (Men's individual)

Medal summary (Women's individual)

Medal summary (Men's Team)

Medal summary (Women's Team)

References

E
2002 in Australian sport
International archery competitions hosted by Australia
World Field Archery Championships